Norberto Oyarbide (1 January 1951 – 1 September 2021) was an Argentine judge.

Career
Oyarbride served as a Justice of the Federal Chamber of Crime of Argentina from 1994 till his retirement in 2016.

Personal life and death
He lived with his husband, Claudio Alonso. Oyarbride died from complications of COVID-19 in September 2021.

References

1951 births
2021 deaths
20th-century Argentine judges
21st-century Argentine judges
Argentine gay men
People from Uruguay Department
Deaths from the COVID-19 pandemic in Argentina